Ossonis is a genus of longhorn beetles of the subfamily Lamiinae, containing the following species:

 Ossonis clytomima Pascoe, 1867
 Ossonis hirsutipes Aurivillius, 1922
 Ossonis indica Breuning, 1954
 Ossonis mentaweiensis Schwarzer, 1930
 Ossonis modiglianii Breuning, 1950
 Ossonis sumatrensis (Pic, 1936)

References

Saperdini